Misogada is a monotypic moth genus of the family Notodontidae erected by Francis Walker in 1865. Its only species, Misogada unicolor, the drab prominent, was first described by Alpheus Spring Packard in 1864. It is found in North America from Nova Scotia to Florida, west to Texas and north to Saskatchewan.

The wingspan is about 45 mm. There are two to three generations per year.

The larvae feed on Populus sect. Aigeiros and Platanus species. Young larvae feed in groups and skeletonize the undersides of the leaves of their host plant. Older larvae are solitary feeders and feed on all of the leaf, only leaving major veins. They are light green with a broad, yellowish-white dorsal stripe and brownish patches and narrow indistinct lines on each side. Full-grown larvae reach a length of  30–42 mm. Larvae can be found from April to September. Young larvae feed close together and skeletonize the undersides of leaves. Large larvae become solitary feeders and will devour all but a leaf's major veins.

References

Moths described in 1864
Notodontidae
Moths of North America
Monotypic moth genera